Predator Of The Empire is Steel Attack's third album, released in 2003 via Arise Records.

Track listing

Album line-up
Dick Johnson - vocals
John Allan - guitar
Dennis Vestman - guitar
Peter Späth - bass
Mike Stark - drums

2003 albums
Steel Attack albums
Albums with cover art by Jean-Pascal Fournier